Provincial Trunk Highway 1A (PTH 1A) is the name used for two provincial primary highways located in the Canadian province of Manitoba. One is located within the city of Portage la Prairie and the other, within and west of the city of Brandon.

Portage la Prairie section

The section of PTH 1A at Portage la Prairie is also known as Saskatchewan Avenue and like most alternate spurs, it was the old route of PTH 1 until its current alignment was built. The highway is an alternate route that goes through Portage la Prairie. The highway in Portage la Prairie is  westbound and  eastbound. The speed limit is  within city limits unless otherwise posted, becoming  on both sides approaching PTH 1.

The highway received its current designation after the Portage la Prairie bypass was completed and opened to traffic in 1970.

Brandon section

This section serves Manitoba's second largest city, Brandon. As noted in the Portage la Prairie section, this was the original route for PTH 1 through Brandon prior to 1959. 

PTH 1A is known as 1st Street north-south and Victoria Avenue east-west inside the city limits, and maintains an east-west designation for the entire route. The route is often used by trucks and buses to Brandon, as well as commuters and tourists and campers.

Not only is the height of the bridge over the highway substandard, there is no shoulder on either side of the highway. These factors make for a very tight entry into this area for both eastbound and westbound motorists. Despite the efforts of the Manitoba government to prevent oversized trucks from attempting to travel under this bridge (which include flashing overhead signs alerting overheight vehicles of the bridge and other signs directing these vehicles to either turn around and/or detour), there are still numerous incidents of trucks either crashing into the bridge or getting stuck in the opening, causing extended closures of the route. Eastbound traffic on the Trans-Canada Highway encounters a sign advising vehicles above the 3.7m limit requiring access to Brandon to continue traveling on PTH 1 approximately  before the junction.

The highway received its current designation when PTH 1 was configured around Brandon in 1959.

References

External links 
Official Highway Map of Manitoba - Portage la Prairie
Official Highway Map of Manitoba - Brandon
Official Name and Location - Declaration of Provincial Trunk Highways Regulation - The Highways and Transportation Act - Provincial Government of Manitoba
Official Highway Map - Published and maintained by the Department of Infrastructure - Provincial Government of Manitoba (see Legend and Map#1 & 2)

001A
Former segments of the Trans-Canada Highway